The Seventh Day is a 2013 novel by Yu Hua. It was published in China by New Star Press in June 2013. An English translation by Allan Hepburn Barr was published by Pantheon Books in January 2015.

Kirkus Reviews stated that Yu Hua "is certainly commenting, often acerbically, on how life and death are valued in contemporary China".

Background
An absurdist fiction novel, The Seventh Day finds Yu Hua comparing the real world to the world of death, and narrating the experiences of the main character, Yang Fei, in the seven days following his death. In The Theory of Yu Hua, Wang points out that The Seventh Day compares the world of life and death. The Seventh Day breaks through the world of life and death, and describes the two completely different worlds.

It is believed that some of the characters' stories (Yang Fei and Yang Jinbiao, Li Yuezhen, Mouse Girl) are based on true stories that were reported in China such as forced relocation, the hospital which treated dead infants as clinical waste, and selling a kidney to buy electronic devices. In the novel, Li Yuezhen exposed that the hospital treated 27 dead infants' remains as clinical waste which was dumped into a nearby river. This is similar to an event that occurred in the Shandong Province, where 21 dead infants' remains was found in the Guangfu river in 2010. In the novel, Wu Chao sells his kidney for money to buy Mouse Girl a new cellphone. This was also similar to news reported in 2012, in Hangzhou, a group of illegal kidney-sellers were exposed by an internet blogger, who went undercover in the group as a kidney seller for fifteen days and later, on May 28, 2012, called the police. During the fifteen days undercover in the house, he recorded his conversations with the kidney-sellers and asked them why were they selling their kidneys. One of them said that he sold his kidney so that he could afford to purchase a new cellphone for his girlfriend, and be able to support his family. In a part of the novel, a man disguised as a woman is caught working as a prostitute. This is similar to an incident reported in the autonomous Guangxi region in 2010, where local police in Liuzhou arrested three people who were engaged in prostitution. The prostitutes were discovered to actually be middle-aged men dressed as women.

Plot
On the first day, after Yang Fei died, he went to the funeral parlour to be cremated, but no urn was prepared for him and no cemetery, so he left the waiting hall and tried to recall the last scene before he died. He remembered he was sitting in the Tan Jia Cai restaurant when he read the report of his ex-wife, Li Qing, cutting her wrist at home in the bathtub. At this time the restaurant kitchen caught fire, his memory stopped with a loud bang.

On the second day, he met his ex-wife, Li Qing, who rejected many chasers but married him. However, Li Qing divorced him and married a new man because Li Qing wanted to get higher achievement on her business. They brought up the memory and Li Qing told Yang Fei that he was the only husband she had. Finally, she left and rushed to her funeral.

On the third day, Yang Fei continued to wander on the street, he remembered his adoptive father Yang Jinbiao who found him as a newborn baby at the edge of the railway track. Yang Jinbiao raised him up alone and even rejected his girlfriend because of Yang Fei. 
One day Yang Fei's biological mother found him and brought him to his original family. However, he returned after few days. When Yang Jinbiao knew his disease could not stay for a long time, he left secretly. Yang Fei kept looking for his father for a long time. When he returned from his father's hometown, his nursing mother Li Yuezhen was dead.

On the fourth day, Yang Fei met Mouse Girl. She and her boyfriend Wu Chao were the neighbor of Yang Fei in the rental house. It was a big news when Mouse Girl suicided because her boyfriend gave her the fake Iphone 4S as her birthday gift, she jumped off from the top of the Pengfei Building. Mouse Girl led Yang Fei to the land of unburied, and Yang Fei kept looking for his father there.

On the fifth day, Yang Fei met a lot of familiar people in the land of unburied, including the girl he was gonna to teach and Tan Jiaxin's family. Then he met Li Yuezhen there, she told him the truth that his father is the receptionist at the funeral parlour, and his father actually went to the stone where he left Yang Fei once.

On the sixth day, after Mouse Girl heard Wu Chao's story from Xiao Qing, she knew Wu Chao sold his kidney to buy her a cemetery. Mouse Girl decided to return to the cemetery Wu Chao bought for her, she became the first person who left the land of unburied. All the deads at the land of unburied baptized Mouse Girl and walked to the funeral parlour with her.

On the seventh day, Yang Fei finally meets his father at the funeral parlour. On the way he back to the land of unburied, he met Wu Chao, who was looking for his girlfriend. Yang Fei told Wu Chao that Mouse Girl went to the cemetery, and Yang Fei brought Wu Chao to the land of unburied.

Main characters
 Yang Fei – an honest and reserved man, was born on a moving train. He was adopted by a young switchman and raised with love. At the age of 41, Yang died in a gas explosion in a restaurant while he's reading a news report on his ex-wife, Li Qing's death. Having no funeral urn nor grave, he then roams around the land of the unburied as a spirit, and encounters his ex-wife, Mouse Girl and her boyfriend, Zhang Gang and Li,  Li Yuezhen and 27 infants, and finally his father.
 Yang Jinbiao – Yang Fei's adoptive father, was working as a switchman when he found Yang Fei on the rails. He once abandoned little Yang Fei on a rock near an orphanage in order to please his fiancée, but brought him back on the very next day. Since then this devoted and obstinate father had decided to remain single for good. He spent the last moment of his life besides the rock of abandonment. In the underworld, he works as an usher in the funeral parlour.
 Li Qing – a beautiful, ambitious and wealthy businesswoman, was married to Yang Fei but left for a businessman whom she later found a trickster and womanizer. After breaking up with the businessman, she became a high official's mistress. She committed suicide by slitting her wrists in her bathtub just before the investigators came to arrest her. Then her spirit meets Yang Fei's at the apartment they once had lived together.
 Li Yuezhen – Yang Jinbiao's coworker, had been helping to nurse and foster Yang Fei  with her husband Hao Qiangsheng. As their daughter Hao Xia has emigrated to and had a family in the U.S., the couple planned to move to America. However, Li was run over and killed in a car accident after she stumbled upon a scandal that 27 dead infants were dumped by the hospital into the river as medical refuses.  she then meets Yang Fei in the land of the unburied with the 27 babies around her singing a song.
 Mouse Girl – whose name is Liu Mei, had been constantly changing her work as hairwasher, restaurant server and other temporary jobs with her boyfriend Wu Chao and lives in low-rent places like bomb shelters. She jumped off a building because Wu deceived her, claiming that her birthday gift—an iPhone was a real one but in fact a knock-off. After Mouse Girl died, Wu Chao managed to sell his kidney to buy her a burial plot. Therefore, Mouse Girl is the first to leave the land of the unburied for a resting place.
 Tan Jiaxin – the owner of Tang Jia Cai restaurant. Yang Fei was a frequent customer of his restaurant. Tan Jiaxin's family died in a gas explosion accident in his restaurant same with Yang Fei. Tan Jiaxin also opens his restaurant in the land of unburied.
 Xiao Qing – neighbor of Mouse Girl and Wu Chao in the real world. Xiao Qing used the money Wu Chao gave him to buy Mouse Girl a cemetery. Xiao Qing died in a traffic accident of bus 203.

Reception
Kirkus Reviews stated that it "falls short of being a fully realized novel" and that it is "episodic". It stated that the novel is characterized by a "lugubrious funk" but that "[c]ompelling moments and black humor" mitigate this effect.

Clarissa Sebag-Montefiore of the South China Morning Post stated overall the book "never quite hits the mark". She stated that the "excellently" done translation of the original Chinese "poetic language" partially made up for the negatives in the book, and that it was "darkly funny" and "desperately dark" at the same time. She criticized how characters "are often reduced to totems". She stated that "If Yu does succeed in The Seventh Day, it is in showing a confused society in which the government casts aside its citizens like rubbish and in which people often treat each other no better."

Ken Kalfus states in an article in The New York Times that the translation is "workmanlike" and that it is "too wordy to deliver its best potential laugh lines."

David Der-wei Wang, Professor of Chinese Literature at Harvard University, suggested that Yu Hua used the narrative technique of "defamiliarization" to observe the living world through the eyes of the dead. He also argued Yu Hua didn't give full play to the nihilist atmosphere which was the crux of the novel, but only stopped at criticizing social issues.

Publication history

References

External links
 Excerpt of The Seventh Day at National Public Radio
 

2013 Chinese novels
Novels by Yu Hua
Novels set in China
Absurdist fiction
Novels about the afterlife